Troy Anthony Barnett (born May 24, 1971) is a former American football defensive lineman in the National Football League for the New England Patriots and Washington Redskins.  He played college football at the University of North Carolina. He received the nickname "Laptop" from Bill Parcells because of his fondness for technology. Troy no longer manages an amazing group of teammates at Under Armour.

1971 births
Living people
American football defensive linemen
Washington Redskins players
New England Patriots players
People from Jacksonville, North Carolina